Robbie Rist (born April 4, 1964) is an 
American actor. He is known for playing Cousin Oliver in The Brady Bunch,  Martin in Grady and "Little John" in Big John, Little John.  Rist is also known for voicing assorted characters in television shows, games and movies, including Stuffy, the overly-proud stuffed dragon in Doc McStuffins, Whiz in Kidd Video, Star in Balto, Maroda in Final Fantasy X,  Choji Akimichi in Naruto, and Michelangelo in the films Teenage Mutant Ninja Turtles (1990), Teenage Mutant Ninja Turtles II: The Secret of the Ooze (1991), Teenage Mutant Ninja Turtles III (1993), and Casey Jones (2011). Additionally, he and director Anthony C. Ferrante provided music for the Sharknado film and the theme song for the Sharknado franchise. He played Ted Baxter's adopted son on The Mary Tyler Moore Show.

Early Life
Rist was born in La Mirada, California on April 4, 1964.

Career

Acting
As a child, Rist played Cousin Oliver in the final six episodes of The Brady Bunch. With the regular children all growing older, his inclusion was intended to reintroduce a cute, younger child to the series. However, the idea backfired as most viewers disliked the Oliver character and the plan became moot as ABC  had opted to not renew the series even before his debut. This gave rise to the TV term "Cousin Oliver Syndrome", also known as "add-a-kid". Oliver uttered the final line of the final episode: "Me! Cousin Oliver! / Gosh it was only a suggestion," but the character and Rist were subsequently omitted from later original-cast revivals of the series.

After The Brady Bunch, he appeared as Glendon Farrell in Lucas Tanner starring David Hartman, "Little John" in the Saturday Morning series Big John, Little John, Tommy in the series premiere for the short-lived CBS drama series Bronk, and Martin in the short-lived Sanford and Son spin-off Grady. During 1975-77,  Rist played David, son of Ted Baxter (Ted Knight) on The Mary Tyler Moore Show. He also appeared in three episodes of The Bionic Woman. In 1980, Rist played "Dr. Zee" on Galactica 1980. He made four guest appearances on CHiPs and the short-lived CBS series Whiz Kids, and also played "Booger" in a failed Revenge of the Nerds TV pilot. In 1986, Rist had a notable supporting role as Milo in the action film, Iron Eagle which was a box-office hit despite being critically panned.

As of 2006, Rist was acting, working with music and also working in film production. Rist produced a horror/comedy film, Stump The Band, directed by William Holmes and JoJo Hendrickson.

In 2013, he portrayed Robbie the Bus Driver in the camp horror film Sharknado. Rist said in an interview that his friend Anthony C. Ferrante came upon the film's poster at the American Film Market and became enthusiastic about the concept. When Ferrante said that he had been approached to direct the film, Rist insisted that Ferrante take the job, and that if he did, that he should have a part in it. He also mentioned that Sharknado was his very first red carpet premiere.

Voice-over work
As an adult, Rist has worked as a voice actor, such as in the Teenage Mutant Ninja Turtles film series (as the voice of Michaelangelo); from 1984 to 1986, he starred in the Saturday morning cartoon Kidd Video, playing the character Whiz both in live-action music videos and animated sequences. He was the voice of Star, a mauve-and-cream Siberian Husky, in the animated 1995 Universal Studios film Balto, and to date, this is his first and only role in a full-length animated film. He was also the voice of Aaron in the PC game Star Warped. An episode of Batman: The Animated Series titled "Baby Doll" contained a character called Cousin Spunky that was intended to boost sagging ratings of the fictional Baby Doll sitcom, a clear reference to Cousin Oliver (Rist lent his voice to the episode, but did not play Cousin Spunky; his character was an adult).

Rist also voices characters Choji Akimichi from Naruto, and Bud Bison from Mega Man Star Force.

Rist was the voice of Stuffy, Doc's overly proud stuffed dragon, in Disney Junior's hit animated series Doc McStuffins.

In 2009, he voiced Griffin in Terminator Salvation. He also provided additional voices in Final Fantasy XIII, as well as reprising his role as Michelangelo in a fan-made movie about Casey Jones.

Rist voiced the reincarnation of Mondo Gecko in TMNT 2012.

In 2014 he appeared as the voice of an alien in the James Rolfe film Angry Video Game Nerd: The Movie.

Music
Rist is also a musician and producer. He has performed as the lead singer, guitarist, bassist and/or drummer for several Los Angeles rock bands, including Wonderboy, The Andersons, Cockeyed Ghost, Nice Guy Eddie, and Steve Barton and the Oblivion Click. The list of west coast pop bands Rist has performed with numbers in the hundreds. He divides his time between film and music production, performing with Los Angeles alt-country band KingsizeMaybe and rock band Jeff Caudill & The Goodtimes Band (with Jeff Caudill of Orange County punk band Gameface and Michael "Popeye" Vogelsang of Orange County punk band Farside). Rist has also produced a number of records for bands, including Suzy & Los Quattro, Backline, Ginger Britt and the Mighty, Jeff Caudill, Steve Barton and the Oblivion Click, Nice Guy Eddie, Kingsizemaybe and The Mockers. Rist produced the album Automatic Toaster for The Rubinoos and played drums on that album. He currently is the drummer for the rock formation Your Favorite Trainwreck.

Rist and director Anthony C. Ferrante provided the music for the Sharknado film, initially writing about six songs for the first film. Rist and Ferrante would provide music for the sequel  Sharknado 2 as the band Quint, and perform its theme song "(The Ballad of) Sharknado", which had originally appeared in the first film but few in the initial audience noticed it. Quint was named after the character in Jaws and served as their band's name for future work on the franchise, including the song "Crash" in Sharknado 3. They also released an EP called Great White Skies with several of the theme song's variants.

Rist and Don Frankel's power-pop group Sundial Symphony recorded two of Paul Levinson's songs -- "Merri Goes Round" and "Looking for Sunsets (In the Early Morning)" --  which were released by Big Stir Records in 2019.

Advertising
In October 2016 and April 2019, Rist was seen promoting The Brady Bunch television series on the MeTV television network.

Filmography

Animation 
 Balto – Star
 Batman: The Animated Series – Brian Daly
 Doc McStuffins – Stuffy
 Godzilla: The Series – Kevin
 Kidd Video – Whiz
 Mighty Magiswords – Frankie Jupiter
Monster Farm – Jack Haylee
 Sonic Boom – Additional voices, Swifty the Shrew
 Teenage Mutant Ninja Turtles – Mondo Gecko
 The Adventures of Puss in Boots – Lamarr, Angry Villager
 The Weekenders – Thomson Oberman, various
 Transformers: Robots in Disguise – Swelter, Tricerashot
 Boruto: Naruto Next Generations – Choji Akimichi (English dub)
Mega Man Star Force - Bud Bison (English dub)
 Naruto – Choji Akimichi (English dub)
 Naruto: Shippuden – Choji Akimichi (English dub)
The Last: Naruto the Movie – Choji Akimichi (English dub)

Live action 
 Little Lulu – Iggy
 The Big Hex of Little Lulu – Iggy
 Angry Video Game Nerd: The Movie – Alien
 Big John, Little John – Little John
 Casey Jones – Michaelangelo
 Galactica 1980 – Dr. Zee
 Grady – Martin
 Iron Eagle – Milo
 Lucas Tanner – Glendon Farrell
 Sharknado– Robbie the Bus Driver
 Teenage Mutant Ninja Turtles – Michaelangelo
 Teenage Mutant Ninja Turtles II: The Secret of the Ooze – Michaelangelo
 Teenage Mutant Ninja Turtles III – Michaelangelo
 The Brady Bunch – Cousin Oliver
 Bronk – Tommy
 The Bionic Woman – Andrew
 The Mary Tyler Moore Show – David Baxter
 Unseen Evil – Bob

Video games 
 Final Fantasy X – Maroda (English dub)
 Final Fantasy X-2 – Maroda (English dub)
 Star Warped – Aaron
 Terminator Salvation – Griffin

References

External links
 
 
 Robbie Rist's page on ReverbNation
 

1964 births
Living people
American male child actors
American male television actors
American male video game actors
American male voice actors
Male actors from Los Angeles
People from La Mirada, California
20th-century American male actors
21st-century American male actors